The 2018 EuroCup Finals were the concluding games of the 2017–18 EuroCup season, the 16th season of Europe's secondary club basketball tournament organised by Euroleague Basketball, the tenth season since it was renamed from the ULEB Cup to the EuroCup, and the second season under the title sponsorship name of 7DAYS. The first leg was played at the Basket-Hall in Krasnodar, Russia, on 10 April 2018, the second leg will be played at the Volkswagen Arena in Istanbul, Turkey, on 13 April 2018 and the third leg, if necessary, would be played at the Basket-Hall in Krasnodar, Russia, on 16 April 2018, between Russian side Lokomotiv Kuban and Turkish side Darüşşafaka.

It was the first ever Finals appearance ever in any European competition of Darüşşafaka and it the second ever final appearance in EuroCup for Lokomotiv Kuban, who ended third two seasons ago in the Euroleague and arrived to the finals with a perfect balance of 20 wins in 20 matches. However, the firsts beat the Russian by 2–0 in the best-of-three series achieving also the qualification to the 2018–19 EuroLeague.

Venues

Road to the Finals

Note: In the table, the score of the finalist is given first (H = home; A = away).

First leg

Second leg

Finals MVP

See also
2018 EuroLeague Final Four
2018 Basketball Champions League Final Four
2018 FIBA Europe Cup Final

References

External links
Official website

Finals
2018